Rangsundøya or Rangsundøy is an island in Rødøy Municipality in Nordland county, Norway. The  island of Rangsundøya is located off the Helgeland coast in a large group of islands. The island of Gjerdøya lies to the north, Storselsøya lies to the southwest, Renga to the northeast, and the mainland is to the south and east.

See also
List of islands of Norway

References

Islands of Nordland
Rødøy